The Reißkofel is, at 2,371 metres above the Adriatic (7,779 ft), the highest mountain of the Gailtal Alps east of the Lienz Dolomites. It is situated in the centre of the Gailtal range, part of the Southern Limestone Alps, in the Austrian state of Carinthia.

The steep massif is mainly composed of Corallian Limestone and Dolomite. The mountain is the culminating point of a long ridge, and is steep and rocky on both its northern and southern faces. It was first climbed in 1848 by Johann Festin von Wald.

References

External links

Mountains of the Alps
Mountains of Carinthia (state)